Slogans (Parullat) is a 2001 Albanian film directed by Gjergj Xhuvani. It was the first Albanian film to be selected to screen on the Director's Fortnight at Cannes Filmfestival 2001 and has gone on to win many other festival awards. It was further Albania's submission to the 74th Academy Awards for the Academy Award for Best Foreign Language Film, but was not accepted as a nominee.

The film presents the ideological brainwashing that characterized the life of Albanians during the times of the communist Enver Hoxha regime. The protagonist is Andrea (Artur Gorishti; Andrea is a male name in Albania), a young and liberal-minded school teacher, who is sent from Tirana to work in a small village school. As a teacher he needs to participate in constructions of socialist and patriotic slogans on the slopes of a hill in the village. He does not take this task very seriously and for this he is continuously scorned by the village's Communist party officials.

See also

Cinema of Albania
List of submissions to the 74th Academy Awards for Best Foreign Language Film

References

External links

2001 films
Albanian-language films
2001 comedy-drama films
Albanian comedy-drama films